The arrondissement of Beauvais is an arrondissement of France in the Oise department in the Hauts-de-France region. It comprises 245 communes.

Composition

The communes of the arrondissement of Beauvais, and their INSEE codes, are:

 Abancourt (60001)
 Abbecourt (60002)
 Achy (60004)
 Allonne (60009)
 Amblainville (60010)
 Andeville (60012)
 Auchy-la-Montagne (60026)
 Auneuil (60029)
 Auteuil (60030)
 Bailleul-sur-Thérain (60041)
 Bazancourt (60049)
 Beaudéduit (60051)
 Beauvais (60057)
 Berneuil-en-Bray (60063)
 Berthecourt (60065)
 Blacourt (60073)
 Blancfossé (60075)
 Blargies (60076)
 Blicourt (60077)
 Bonlier (60081)
 Bonnières (60084)
 Bornel (60088)
 Boubiers (60089)
 Bouconvillers (60090)
 Boury-en-Vexin (60095)
 Boutencourt (60097)
 Bouvresse (60098)
 Bresles (60103)
 Briot (60108)
 Brombos (60109)
 Broquiers (60110)
 Buicourt (60114)
 Campeaux (60122)
 Canny-sur-Thérain (60128)
 Catheux (60131)
 Cauvigny (60135)
 Cempuis (60136)
 Chambors (60140)
 Chaumont-en-Vexin (60143)
 Chavençon (60144)
 Choqueuse-les-Bénards (60153)
 Conteville (60161)
 Corbeil-Cerf (60162)
 Cormeilles (60163)
 La Corne-en-Vexin (60209)
 Le Coudray-Saint-Germer (60164)
 Le Coudray-sur-Thelle (60165)
 Courcelles-lès-Gisors (60169)
 Crèvecœur-le-Grand (60178)
 Crillon (60180)
 Le Crocq (60182)
 Croissy-sur-Celle (60183)
 Cuigy-en-Bray (60187)
 Daméraucourt (60193)
 Dargies (60194)
 Delincourt (60195)
 Doméliers (60199)
 La Drenne (60196)
 Élencourt (60205)
 Énencourt-Léage (60208)
 Éragny-sur-Epte (60211)
 Ernemont-Boutavent (60214)
 Escames (60217)
 Esches (60218)
 Escles-Saint-Pierre (60219)
 Espaubourg (60220)
 Fay-les-Étangs (60228)
 Le Fay-Saint-Quentin (60230)
 Feuquières (60233)
 Flavacourt (60235)
 Fleury (60239)
 Fontaine-Bonneleau (60240)
 Fontaine-Lavaganne (60242)
 Fontaine-Saint-Lucien (60243)
 Fontenay-Torcy (60244)
 Formerie (60245)
 Fouilloy (60248)
 Fouquenies (60250)
 Fouquerolles (60251)
 Francastel (60253)
 Fresne-Léguillon (60257)
 Frocourt (60264)
 Le Gallet (60267)
 Gaudechart (60269)
 Gerberoy (60271)
 Glatigny (60275)
 Goincourt (60277)
 Gourchelles (60280)
 Grandvilliers (60286)
 Grémévillers (60288)
 Grez (60289)
 Guignecourt (60290)
 Hadancourt-le-Haut-Clocher (60293)
 Halloy (60295)
 Le Hamel (60297)
 Hannaches (60296)
 Hanvoile (60298)
 Haucourt (60301)
 Haudivillers (60302)
 Hautbos (60303)
 Haute-Épine (60304)
 Les Hauts Talican (60054)
 Hécourt (60306)
 Hénonville (60309)
 Herchies (60310)
 Héricourt-sur-Thérain (60312)
 Hermes (60313)
 Hétomesnil (60314)
 Hodenc-en-Bray (60315)
 Hodenc-l'Évêque (60316)
 La Houssoye (60319)
 Ivry-le-Temple (60321)
 Jaméricourt (60322)
 Jouy-sous-Thelle (60327)
 Juvignies (60328)
 Laboissière-en-Thelle (60330)
 Labosse (60331)
 Lachapelle-aux-Pots (60333)
 Lachapelle-Saint-Pierre (60334)
 Lachapelle-sous-Gerberoy (60335)
 Lachaussée-du-Bois-d'Écu (60336)
 Lafraye (60339)
 Lalande-en-Son (60343)
 Lalandelle (60344)
 Lannoy-Cuillère (60347)
 Lattainville (60352)
 Lavacquerie (60353)
 Laverrière (60354)
 Laversines (60355)
 Lavilletertre (60356)
 Lhéraule (60359)
 Liancourt-Saint-Pierre (60361)
 Lierville (60363)
 Lihus (60365)
 Loconville (60367)
 Lormaison (60370)
 Loueuse (60371)
 Luchy (60372)
 Maisoncelle-Saint-Pierre (60376)
 Aux Marais (60703)
 Marseille-en-Beauvaisis (60387)
 Martincourt (60388)
 Maulers (60390)
 Méru (60395)
 Le Mesnil-Conteville (60397)
 Le Mesnil-Théribus (60401)
 Milly-sur-Thérain (60403)
 Moliens (60405)
 Monceaux-l'Abbaye (60407)
 Monneville (60411)
 Montagny-en-Vexin (60412)
 Montchevreuil (60256)
 Montjavoult (60420)
 Montreuil-sur-Thérain (60426)
 Monts (60427)
 Le Mont-Saint-Adrien (60428)
 Mortefontaine-en-Thelle (60433)
 Morvillers (60435)
 Mouchy-le-Châtel (60437)
 Muidorge (60442)
 Mureaumont (60444)
 Neuville-Bosc (60452)
 La Neuville-sur-Oudeuil (60458)
 La Neuville-Vault (60460)
 Nivillers (60461)
 Noailles (60462)
 Novillers (60469)
 Offoy (60472)
 Omécourt (60476)
 Ons-en-Bray (60477)
 Oroër (60480)
 Oudeuil (60484)
 Parnes (60487)
 Pierrefitte-en-Beauvaisis (60490)
 Pisseleu (60493)
 Ponchon (60504)
 Porcheux (60510)
 Pouilly (60512)
 Prévillers (60514)
 Puiseux-en-Bray (60516)
 Quincampoix-Fleuzy (60521)
 Rainvillers (60523)
 Reilly (60528)
 Rochy-Condé (60542)
 Romescamps (60545)
 Rotangy (60549)
 Rothois (60550)
 Roy-Boissy (60557)
 Saint-Arnoult (60566)
 Saint-Aubin-en-Bray (60567)
 Saint-Crépin-Ibouvillers (60570)
 Saint-Deniscourt (60571)
 Sainte-Geneviève (60575)
 Saint-Germain-la-Poterie (60576)
 Saint-Germer-de-Fly (60577)
 Saint-Léger-en-Bray (60583)
 Saint-Martin-le-Nœud (60586)
 Saint-Maur (60588)
 Saint-Omer-en-Chaussée (60590)
 Saint-Paul (60591)
 Saint-Pierre-es-Champs (60592)
 Saint-Quentin-des-Prés (60594)
 Saint-Samson-la-Poterie (60596)
 Saint-Sulpice (60598)
 Saint-Thibault (60599)
 Saint-Valery (60602)
 Sarcus (60604)
 Sarnois (60605)
 Le Saulchoy (60608)
 Savignies (60609)
 Senantes (60611)
 Senots (60613)
 Serans (60614)
 Sérifontaine (60616)
 Silly-Tillard (60620)
 Sommereux (60622)
 Songeons (60623)
 Sully (60624)
 Talmontiers (60626)
 Therdonne (60628)
 Thérines (60629)
 Thibivillers (60630)
 Thieuloy-Saint-Antoine (60633)
 Tillé (60639)
 Tourly (60640)
 Trie-Château (60644)
 Trie-la-Ville (60645)
 Troissereux (60646)
 Valdampierre (60652)
 Vaudancourt (60659)
 Le Vaumain (60660)
 Le Vauroux (60662)
 Velennes (60663)
 Verderel-lès-Sauqueuse (60668)
 Viefvillers (60673)
 Villembray (60677)
 Villeneuve-les-Sablons (60678)
 Villers-Saint-Barthélemy (60681)
 Villers-Saint-Sépulcre (60685)
 Villers-sur-Auchy (60687)
 Villers-sur-Bonnières (60688)
 Villers-Vermont (60691)
 Vrocourt (60697)
 Wambez (60699)
 Warluis (60700)

History

The arrondissement of Beauvais was created in 1800.

As a result of the reorganisation of the cantons of France which came into effect in 2015, the borders of the cantons are no longer related to the borders of the arrondissements. The cantons of the arrondissement of Beauvais were, as of January 2015:

 Auneuil
 Beauvais-Nord-Est
 Beauvais-Nord-Ouest
 Beauvais-Sud-Ouest
 Chaumont-en-Vexin
 Le Coudray-Saint-Germer
 Crèvecoeur-le-Grand
 Formerie
 Grandvilliers
 Marseille-en-Beauvaisis
 Méru
 Nivillers
 Noailles
 Songeons

References

Beauvais